Christophe Van Reusel (born 18 February 1983) is a French former professional footballer who played as a defender. He played on the professional level in Ligue 2 for Nîmes Olympique.

Career
At the end of the 2010–11 season, Van Reusel moved from FU Narbonne to Gardanne (CFA 2).

References

1983 births
Living people
French footballers
Association football defenders
Ligue 2 players
Championnat National players
Championnat National 2 players
Championnat National 3 players
Nîmes Olympique players
Trélissac FC players
Genêts Anglet players